The , also known as Kempeitai, was the military police or gendarmerie of the Imperial Japanese Army from 1881 to 1945 that also served as a secret police force. In addition, in Japanese-occupied territories, the Kenpeitai arrested or killed those suspected of being anti-Japanese. While institutionally part of the army, the Kenpeitai also discharged military police functions for the Imperial Japanese Navy under the direction of the Admiralty Minister (although the IJN had its own much smaller Tokkeitai), those of the executive police under the direction of the Home Minister and those of the judicial police under the direction of the Justice Minister. A member of the Kenpeitai corps was called a kenpei (憲兵).

History 

Its model was the National Gendarmerie of France. Details of the Kenpeitai's military, executive, and judicial police functions were defined by the Kenpei Rei of 1898, which was amended twenty-six times before Japan's defeat in August 1945.

The force initially consisted of 349 men. At the beginning, enforcement of new conscription legislation was an important part of their duty, largely due to resistance from peasant families. In 1907, the Kenpeitai was ordered to Korea, where its main duty was legally defined as "preserving the peace", although it also functioned as a military police for the Japanese Army stationed there. Its status remained basically unchanged after Japan's annexation of Korea in 1910.

The Kenpeitai maintained public order within Japan under the direction of the Interior Minister, and in the occupied territories under the direction of the Minister of War. Japan also had a civilian secret police force, Tokkō, which was the Japanese acronym of Tokubetsu Kōtō Keisatsu ("Special Higher Police", also known by various nicknames such as the Peace Police and as the Thought Police) that was part of the Interior Ministry. However, the Kenpeitai had a Tokkō branch of its own, and through it discharged the functions of a secret police.

When the Kenpeitai arrested a civilian under the direction of the Justice Minister, the arrested person was nominally subject to civilian judicial proceedings.

The Kenpeitai's brutality was particularly notorious in Korea and the other occupied territories. The Kenpeitai were also abhorred on the Japanese mainland, especially during World War II when Prime Minister Hideki Tojo, formerly the Kenpeitai Commander of the Japanese Army in Manchuria from 1935 to 1937, used the Kenpeitai extensively to ensure everyone's loyalty and commitment to the war effort.

According to the US Army Handbook on Japanese Military Forces, there were over 36,000 regular Kenpeitai members and numerous ethnic "auxiliaries" at the end of the war. As foreign territories fell under Japanese military occupation during the 1930s and the early 1940s, the Kenpeitai recruited large numbers of locals in those territories. Taiwanese and Koreans were extensively used as auxiliaries to police the newly occupied territories in Southeast Asia, although the Kenpeitai also carried out recruitment activity among peoples native to French Indochina (especially from Vietnamese members of the Cao Dai religious sect), Malaya, and other territories. The Kenpeitai may have trained Trình Minh Thế, a Vietnamese nationalist and anti-Viet Minh military leader.

The Kenpeitai was disarmed and disbanded after the Japanese surrender in August 1945.

Today, the post-war Self-Defense Forces' internal police is called Keimutai (警務隊). Each individual member is called Keimukan. Modelled on the military Police in the United States and other Western armed forces, the SDF internal police has no jurisdiction over civilians.

Intra-Axis co-operation 

In the 1920s and the 1930s the Kenpeitai forged various connections with certain pre-war European intelligence services. Later, following the signing of the Tripartite Pact in 1940, Japan formed formal links with military intelligence units now under German and Italian fascists: the German Abwehr and Italian Servizio Informazioni Militare. The Army and Navy of Japan contacted their counterparts in Wehrmacht intelligence, in the Schutzstaffel (SS) and in Kriegsmarine units about information on Europe and vice versa. The Axis powers fully understood the benefits of such exchanges. For example, the Japanese sent the Germans data about  Soviet forces in the  Far East and Operation Barbarossa from their  embassy in Berlin.  Admiral Canaris offered Japan information and assistance on the neutrality of Portugal in Timor.

One important point of contact was the  Penang submarine-base in  Japanese-occupied Malaya, which served Axis submarine forces of the Italian  Italian Regia Marina,  German Kriegsmarine and  Imperial Japanese Navy. At regular intervals, technological and information exchanges occurred at the base. While still available to them, Axis forces used bases in Italian East Africa, in the Vichy France colony of Madagascar and in officially neutral places like Portuguese India.

Human rights abuses 
The Kenpeitai ran extensive criminal and collaborationist networks, extorting vast amounts of money from businesses and civilians wherever they operated. They also ran the Japanese prisoner of war system, which treated captives with extreme brutality. Many of the abuses were documented in Japanese war crimes trials, such as those committed by the Kempeitai East District Branch in Singapore, including the Sook Ching.

The Kenpeitai also carried out revenge attacks against prisoners and civilians. For example, after Colonel Doolittle's raid on Tokyo in 1942, it carried out reprisals against thousands of Chinese civilians and captured airmen, and in 1943 committed the Double Tenth massacre in response to an Allied raid on Singapore Harbour. The Kenpeitai also supplied 600 men, women and children per year to the infamous Unit 731, which conducted human experimentation.

Organization 

The Kenpeitai was divided into three branches: the Keimu Han (police and security), Naikin Han (Administration), and Tokumu Han (Special Duties).

The Kenpeitai's General Affairs Branch was in charge of the force's policy, personnel management, internal discipline, as well as communication with the Ministries of the Admiralty, Interior, and Justice. The Operations Branch was in charge of the distribution of military police units within the army, general public security, and intelligence.

The Kenpeitai maintained a headquarters in each relevant Area Army, commanded by a Shosho (Major General), with a Taisa (Colonel) as Executive Officer. The headquarters comprised two or three field offices, each staffed with approximately 375 personnel and commanded by a Chusa (Lieutenant Colonel), with a Shosa (Major) as Executive Officer. The field offices in turn were divided into 65-man sections called 'buntai', each commanded by a Tai-i (Captain), with a Chu-i (First Lieutenant) as Executive Officer. The buntai were further divided into 20-man detachments called bunkentai, commanded by a Sho-i (Second Lieutenant), with a Junshikan (Warrant Officer) as Executive Officer. Keeping with the main organizational structure of the Kenpeitai, each of these detachments contained a police and security squad, an administration squad, and a special duties squad.

Kenpeitai Auxiliary units consisting of regional ethnic forces were organized in occupied areas. These troops supplemented the Kenpeitai and were considered part of the organization, but were limited to the rank of Socho (Sergeant Major).

By 1937, the Kenpeitai had 315 officers and 6,000 enlisted personnel as part of its official forces. The Allies estimated there were at least 7,500 Kenpeitai members by the end of World War II.

Active units 
The Kenpeitai operated commands on the Japanese mainland and throughout all occupied and captured overseas territories during the Pacific War. The external units operating outside Japan were:
 First Field Kenpeitai – commanded by Major-General Kōichi Ōno from August 1941 to 23 January 1942 and probably based in China with the Japanese Kwantung Army
 Second Field Kenpeitai – attached to the 25th Army and based in Singapore from 1942, the unit was under the command of Lieutenant-Colonel Oishi Masayuki. In January 1944, Malaya came under the responsibility of Third Field Kempeitai Major-General Masanori Kojima.
 Third Field Kenpeitai – drawn from a Manchurian Kenpei Training Regiment in July 1941, attached to the 16th Army and based in Java and Sumatra from 1942. The unit headquarters were in Batavia under the command of Lieutenant-Colonel Kuzumi Kenzaburo. By war's end, the unit had 772 members.
 Fourth Field Kenpeitai
 Fifth Field Kenpeitai
 Sixth Field Kenpeitai – attached to the 8th Area Army based at Rabaul, Papua New Guinea
 Seventh Field Kenpeitai
 Eighth Field Kenpeitai – attached to the 2nd Army on Halmahera, Indonesia
 Ninth Field Kenpeitai
 Tenth Field Kenpeitai
 Eleventh Field Kenpeitai – commanded by Colonel Shōshichi Kamisago from November 1941 to August 1942, when he became head of the 1st Army Kenpeitai Southern Section

Wartime missions 

The Kenpeitai was responsible for the following:
 Travel permits
 Labor recruitment
 Counterintelligence and counterpropaganda (run by the Tokko-Kenpeitai as 'anti-ideological work')
 Supply requisitioning and rationing
 Psychological operations and propaganda
 Rear area security

In addition, by 1944, despite the obvious tide of war, the Kenpeitai were arresting people for antiwar sentiment and defeatism.

Uniform 
Kenpeitai personnel wore either the standard M1938 field uniform or the cavalry uniform with high black leather boots. Civilian clothes were also authorized with rank badges or the Japanese Imperial chrysanthemum worn under the jacket lapel. Uniformed personnel also wore a black chevron on their uniforms and a white armband on the left arm with the characters ken (憲, "law") and hei (兵, "soldier"), together read as kenpei or kempei, which translates to "military police".

Until 1942, a full dress uniform comprising a red kepi, gold and red waist sash, dark blue tunic and trousers with black facings was authorized for Kenpeitai officers on ceremonial occasions. Rank insignia comprised gold Austrian knots and epaulettes.

Kenpeitai officers were armed with a cavalry sabre and pistol, while enlisted men had a pistol and bayonet. Junior NCOs carried a shinai (竹刀, "bamboo kendo sword"), especially when dealing with prisoners.

Other intelligence sections 
 The Kenpeitai (Imperial Japanese Gendarmerie) had responsibilities similar to German SS and SD units, carrying out both internal and external surveillance, and using the kikosaku doctrine of lethal extrajudicial punishment, often as a brutal interrogation method, against perceived exterior enemies, defectors and traitors.
 A similar Japanese wartime special unit was the Overseas Security and Colonial Police Service, tasked with maintaining security in occupied Southeast Asian territories, in addition to carrying out various administrative responsibilities.

See also 
 Internal security
 History of espionage
 List of Japanese spies, 1930–45
 Police services of the Empire of Japan (Keishichō, until 1945)
 Unit 100
 Fukushima Yasumasa (Kenpeitai founder)
 Tenko (TV series)
 The Man in the High Castle (TV series)

References

External links 

 Japanese World War II-era nationalist groups
 U.S. Report on Kempei (1945)

Imperial Japanese Army
Political repression in Japan
Defunct Japanese intelligence agencies
Defunct law enforcement agencies of Japan
Japan
Intelligence services of World War II
Secret police